Irina Viktorovna Tchachina (also Chashchina or Tchashchina, ; born 24 April 1982) is  a retired Russian individual rhythmic gymnast. She is the 2004 Olympic silver medalist in all-around, a two-time (2003, 2005) World all-around bronze medalist, the 2004 European all-around bronze medalist and 2000 Grand Prix Final all-around silver medalist.

Personal life 
Tchachina was born to a Russian family as the eldest of three children. She has a younger brother and sister.
In late 2011, Tchachina married Russian businessman Evgeny Arkhipov.

Skills in rhythmic gymnastics 
Tchachina was a technical gymnast.

Competitive career 

Tchachina began training at the age of six in her hometown of Omsk (also the hometown of Galima Shugurova, Evgenia Kanaeva, Tatiana Druchinina, Ksenia Dudkina, Sofya Skomorokh). After she became impressed watching the World Rhythmic Gymnastics Championships on television, her grandfather, a devoted amateur sportsman, took her to a sports school. Her early days were filled with music lessons, swimming and rhythmic gymnastics. Faced with a choice at age 11, she chose gymnastics. She was coached by Vera Shtelbaums and her daughter Elena Arais since the age of five. Her favourite gymnasts are Olena Vitrychenko and Yanina Batyrchina.

Tchachina's first victory was at age eight at the Omskaya oblast championship. By age 12 she was a member of Russia's national team and routinely travelled to Moscow to take part in training camps. As a junior, she placed first at the CIS Spatakiada, and won the Russian women's championships twice in a row.

In August 1999, Tchachina began training at the Olympic Preparatory School under the guidance of Irina Viner, and around the same time she won the World Championships in Osaka, Japan. In 2001, she won the gold in the hoop and silver in the individual all-around, ball, clubs and rope at the 2001 World Rhythmic Gymnastics Championships in Madrid, Spain, but Tchachina and her teammate Alina Kabaeva tested positive for a banned diuretic and were stripped of their medals. Irina Viner, the Russian head coach, who also served as the Vice President of the FIG Rhythmic Gymnastics Technical Committee at the time, said her gymnasts had been taking a food supplement called "Hyper" containing mild diuretics, which, according to Viner, the gymnasts were taking for pre-menstrual syndrome. When the supply ran out shortly before the Goodwill Games, the team physiotherapist restocked at a local pharmacy. According to Viner, the supplement sold there was fake and contained furosemide. The commission requested the Goodwill Games organizing committee nullify Kabaeva and Tchachina's results.

In 2003, Tchachina sustained an ankle injury, and dealt with it for two years. The same year she and Kabaeva made their return to competitive gymnastics following their ban. Tchachina won the all-around bronze medal at the 2003 World Championships, silver in clubs and bronze in hoop event finals.

In 2004, Tchachina won the all-around bronze medal at the 2004 European Championships behind Ukraine's Anna Bessonova. At the 2004 Athens Olympics, Tchachina won the silver medal in the all-around competition, scoring 107.325 points (Hoop 27.100, Ball 27.100, Clubs 26.825, Ribbon 26.300) – her teammate Alina Kabaeva took the gold with a score of 108.400.

After the Olympic season, Tchachina experienced a recurring ankle injury. Although no longer in top form, she was still able to win the bronze medal in all-around at the 2005 World Championships and a pair of bronze medals in clubs and rope finals. She retired from rhythmic gymnastics in early 2006.

Later career 
After her retirement, Tchachina was invited to the Russian television project "Dances on Ice", partnering with Olympic bronze medalist ice dancer Ruslan Goncharov. She also appeared on the project "Circus with stars" along with other athletes, including Svetlana Khorkina. Tchachina then starred as the lead heroine in the Russian film "The Way" (2009 film) with Artem Mikhalkov. Tchachina wrote an autobiography titled Irina Tchachina: Being Yourself. Commenting on her sport, she said: "Besides your body, you should train your mind too. Intelligence is crucial to rhythmic gymnastics."

On 4 December 2012, at the conference of the Russian Federation of Rhythmic Gymnastics in Novogorsk, Tchachina was elected vice-president of The Russian Rhythmic Gymnastics Federation (RRGF) along with 2008 and 2012 Olympic champion Evgenia Kanaeva. Tchachina was recommended by Irina Viner for the position of President of the Russian Rhythmic Gymnastics Federation (RRGF) but she declined.

In May 2013, Tchachina opened up her rhythmic gymnastics school named after her in Barnaul, Altai Krai. The Opening Ceremony was attended by other rhythmic gymnasts Liubov Charkashyna, Natalia Godunko and Olga Kapranova.

On 15 February 2015, a star-studded gala was held in Russia for the 80th founding anniversary of Rhythmic Gymnastics. The venue was held in the historical Mariinsky Theatre in St. Petersburg. Among those who performed at the gala were Russian former Olympic champions, Olympic medalists and World champions including: Tchachina, Evgenia Kanaeva, Yulia Barsukova, Daria Dmitrieva, and Yana Batyrshina.

Routine music information

Detailed Olympic results

References

External links

 
 Irina Tchachina at r-gymnastics.com 
 
 
 
 Official website 

1982 births
Living people
Russian rhythmic gymnasts
Olympic gymnasts of Russia
Olympic silver medalists for Russia
Gymnasts at the 2004 Summer Olympics
Doping cases in gymnastics
Russian sportspeople in doping cases
Sportspeople from Omsk
Olympic medalists in gymnastics
Medalists at the 2004 Summer Olympics
Medalists at the Rhythmic Gymnastics World Championships
Medalists at the Rhythmic Gymnastics European Championships
World Games gold medalists
Universiade medalists in gymnastics
Competitors at the 2001 World Games
Universiade gold medalists for Russia
Universiade silver medalists for Russia
Universiade bronze medalists for Russia
Medalists at the 2003 Summer Universiade
Medalists at the 2005 Summer Universiade
Competitors at the 2001 Goodwill Games